Cochylimorpha obliquana is a species of moth of the family Tortricidae. It is found in Austria, Slovakia, Hungary, Romania and Russia (Sarepta, Uralsk, Emba, northern Caucasus).

The wingspan is 13–19 mm. Adults have been recorded on wing from June to September.

The larvae feed on Artemisia maritima.

References

O
Moths of Europe
Moths described in 1844